Hentze is a surname. Notable people with the surname include:

Ebba Hentze (1930–2015), Faroese writer
Matthias Hentze (born 1960), German scientist